Wizardry is a series of role-playing video games, developed by Sir-Tech, that were highly influential in the evolution of modern role-playing video games. The original Wizardry was a significant influence on early console role-playing games such as Final Fantasy and Dragon Quest. Originally made for the Apple II, the games were later ported to other platforms. The last game in the original series by Sir-Tech was Wizardry 8, released in 2001. There have since been various spin-off titles developed for the Japanese market.

Development
Wizardry began as a simple dungeon crawl by Andrew C. Greenberg and Robert Woodhead. It was written when they were students at Cornell University and published by Sir-Tech. The game was influenced by earlier games from the PLATO system, most notably Oubliette. The earliest installments of Wizardry were very successful, as they were the first graphically-rich incarnations of Dungeons & Dragons-type gameplay for home computers.  The release of the first version coincided with the height of Dungeons & Dragons' popularity in North America.

The first five games in the series were written in Apple Pascal, an implementation of UCSD Pascal. They were ported to many different platforms by writing UCSD Pascal implementations for the target machines (Mac II cross-development). David W. Bradley took over the series after the fourth installment, adding a new level of plot and complexity. In 1998, the rights were transferred to 1259190 Ontario Inc., and in 2006, to Aeria IPM. In 2008, Aeria IPM merged with Gamepot, the developer of Wizardry Online and in 2017, Gamepot was shut down and absorbed into its parent company GMO Internet.

Datamost released the menu-driven WizPlus, a utility program that allowed users to make changes to both the characters and also to the playing environment of Wizardry; Bob Reams reviewed the utility for Computer Gaming World, and stated that "WizPlus should be used with great caution or the spirit of adventuring will be diluted and, more importantly, you will not be able to continue with this exciting series."

Games

Main series
The original Wizardry series is composed of eight different titles. All of the titles were first released in North America, and then ported to Japanese computers. Some of the titles were also officially released in Europe. The first three games are a trilogy, with similar settings, plots, and gameplay mechanics. A second trilogy is formed by installments 6 through 8 – Bane of the Cosmic Forge, Crusaders of the Dark Savant and Wizardry 8 – with settings and gameplay mechanics that differed greatly from the first trilogy. The fourth game, The Return of Werdna, was a significant departure from the rest of the series. In it, the player controls Werdna ("Andrew," one of the game's developers, spelled backwards), the evil wizard slain in the first game, and summons groups of monsters to aid him as he fights his way through the prison in which he had been held captive. Rather than monsters, the player faced typical adventuring parties, some of which were pulled from actual user disks sent to Sir-Tech for recovery. Further, the player had only a limited number of keystrokes to use to complete the game.

In Japan, the Wizardry series was translated by ASCII Entertainment, and became very influential during the 1980s, even as its popularity at home declined. When first introduced, the games suffered from the culture barrier compounded by low-quality translation. This meant that the game was taken seriously by players who overlooked the in-game jokes and parodies. For example, Blade Cusinart was introduced in early games as "a legendary sword made by the famous blacksmith, Cusinart " but its meaning was misinterpreted because Cuisinart food processors were virtually unknown in Japan. However, this misconception appealed to early computer gamers who were looking for something different and made the Wizardry series popular. Conversely, the fourth game, The Return of Werdna, was poorly received, as, lacking the knowledge of subcultures necessary to solving the game, Japanese players had no chance of figuring out some puzzles.

The eight main titles in the series are:

Spin-offs
In 1996, the series received the first (and, so far, only) spin-off developed in North America, titled Wizardry Nemesis. It is played as a solo adventure: one character only, with no supporting party or monsters. All players use the same character, without the ability to choose class or attributes. In addition, the game contains only 16 spells, compared to 50 in the first four adventures, and more in the subsequent ones. It is also the first Wizardry title where the player saw enemies in advance and thus could try to avoid them.

The popularity of Wizardry in Japan inspired several original sequels, spinoffs, and ports, with the series long outliving the American original. As of 2017, thirty-nine different spin-offs were released in Japan, with four of them also making their way to North America: Wizardry: Tale of the Forsaken Land, Wizardry: Labyrinth of Lost Souls, Wizardry Online and Wizrogue: Labyrinth of Wizardry. The latest is also the last original game produced in the series, released in Japan in 2014, and officially released in English worldwide in 2017.

Reception
The original Wizardry game was a success, selling 24,000 copies by June 1982, just nine months after its release according to Softalk's sales surveys. In the June 1983, issue of Electronic Games, Wizardry was described as "without a doubt, the most popular fantasy adventure game for the Apple II at the present time". While noting limitations such as the inability to divide the party, or the emphasis on combat over role-playing, the magazine stated that "no other game comes closer to providing the type of contest favored by most players of non-electronic role-playing games... one outstanding programming achievement, and an absolute 'must buy' for those fantasy gamers who own an Apple". In the May–June 1982, issue of Computer Gaming World, the reviewer praises Wizardry as setting a standard by which all Fantasy Role Playing Game should be compared to, and call it an all time classic. By 1987, the series had sold over 1.5 million copies and by 1996, over 5 million copies had been sold.

Spin-offs originally released in Japan received generally positive reviews in North America. GameSpot reviewed Wizardry: Tale of the Forsaken Land in 2002, and awarded it a score of 8.5 out of 10. In 2011, Wizardry: Labyrinth of Lost Souls was also reviewed by GameSpot and received a score of 7.5 out of 10. In Japan, readers of Famitsu magazine considered the Famicom port of the original Wizardry I to be one of the 100 best games of all time. The series was ranked as the 60th top game (collectively) by Next Generation in 1996. They cited the "huge dungeons with elaborate quests and tons of differing enemies." Fans of the series included Robin Williams, Harry Anderson, and the Crown Prince of Bahrain; the latter even called Sir-Tech on the phone.

Legacy

Innovation in gameplay
Together with the Ultima series, Wizardry established the conventions of role-playing video games.  The command-driven battle system with a still image of the monster being fought would be emulated in later games, such as The Bard's Tale, Dragon Quest, and Final Fantasy. The party-based combat in Wizardry also inspired Richard Garriott to include a similar party-based system in Ultima III: Exodus.  Other user interface elements were influential in Japanese role-playing games.  The later Wizardry games implemented multiple endings, some of which were only accessible to people who imported characters from previous games.

Wizardry features what would later be called prestige classes.  Aside from the traditional character classes, such as fighter, players could take more advanced ones that combined the abilities of multiple classes if they had the right attributes and alignment.  In the early Wizardry games, some classes were inaccessible during character creation due to the high requirements; this meant the player needed to first gain levels and then change their class. Wizardry VI allowed starting with any class if the player invested enough time during the random character attribute generation.

Influence on subsequent games
Wizardry inspired many clones and served as a template for role-playing video games.  Some notable series that trace their look and feel to Wizardry include 1985's The Bard's Tale and the Might and Magic series.  The specific Wizardry formula, that of a turn based RPG taking place primarily in a dungeon via first person exploration, is referred to as a dungeon crawl.

Wizardry is the major inspiration to the Nintendo DS title The Dark Spire. While the game follows its own story and maps, much of the game uses the same game play mechanics, even going so far as including a "classic" mode that removes all of the game's graphics, replacing them with a wireframe environment, 8-bit-style sprites for monsters and characters, and chiptune music. The game's publisher, Atlus, also published another Wizardry spin-off, Wizardry: Tale of the Forsaken Land.

While designing the popular Japanese role-playing game Dragon Quest, Yuji Horii drew inspiration from the Wizardry series, 1986's Mugen no Shinzou (Heart of Phantasm), and the Ultima series of games. Horii's obsession with Wizardry was manifested as an easter egg in one of his earlier games, The Portopia Serial Murder Case in 1983. In a dungeon-crawling portion of that adventure game, a note on the wall reads "MONSTER SURPRISED YOU." The English fan translation added a sidenote explaining "This is Yuji Horii wishing he could have made this game an RPG like Wizardry!"

Wizardry's legacy continued in Japan after the parent company ended, with titles such as Wizardry Gaiden, Wizardry Empire, and Wizardry XTH, being developed after the original games were released and generally keeping the same tropes, themes, and mechanics.

Notably Wizardry XTH: Academy of Frontier swapped the original's Gothic themes for a modern day military school setting, adding item crafting and party member compatibility to the Wizardry formula.  Much like the original Wizardry, XTH spawned a direct storyline sequel, Wizardry XTH: Unlimited Students. The second XTH game was used as the basis for and shared code with Class of Heroes, which swapped the modern science fiction elements for a combination of High School, High Fantasy, and Anime aesthetics.  Class of Heroes would go on to spawn several sequels and spinoffs itself.

Following the shutdown of Michaelsoft, the director of Wizardry XTH, Motoya Ataka took a group of programmers he called "Team Muramasa" that had worked on Empire and XTH and went on to found Experience Inc., creating a series of PC games with Wizardry XTH's mechanics called Generation Xth.  These would later be ported to the PlayStation Vita, their ports localized as Operation Abyss and Operation Babel.  Experience would go on to create several other DRPGs using Wizardry's mechanics as a starting point, including Students of the Round, Stranger of Sword City, and Demon Gaze.

Starfish, the development team behind Wizardry Empire, would later go on to create Elminage, a series of DRPGs that retained the original Gothic aesthetic (and difficulty) of the western Wizardry games.  Elminage was notable for using the expanded "kemonojin" races from Wizardry Asterisk, also by Starfish, as well as the summoner class from Wizardry: Summoner—these included "Were-Beast," "Dragonnewt," "Fairy," and "Devilkin" as well as expanded classes such as "Brawler" (a hand to hand melee specialist), "Alchemist" (a combination crafting class and spellcaster), and "Summoner" (a spellcasting class that can tame and summon monsters from the dungeon).  These "expanded" Japanese Wizardry mechanics would be reused in future Elminage games as well as notably Class of Heroes.

After cancellation of Wizardry: Stones of Arnhem in the mid 1990s, one of the developers, Cleveland Mark Blakemore, started work on the game Grimoire: Heralds of the Winged Exemplar which is heavily Wizardry inspired. It was eventually released in August 2017.

Wizardry Renaissance
In 2009, several Japanese publishers and development teams started a "Brand Revitalization plan," which they called the "Wizardry Renaissance". After Sir-Tech, the original Wizardry creator in the US, was dissolved, several semi-official games were created in Japan of varying quality and thematic elements. "Wizardry Renaissance" aimed to "rebuild" the brand by agreeing to a certain "worldview" and quality standards to these semi-official Wizardry games.

Wizardry Renaissance titles include:

 Wizardry Online, a PC MMORPG, shut down in 2016.
 Wizardry: Torawareshi Tamashii no Meikyū, a PlayStation 3, iOS, Vita, and PC RPG (localized in the West as Wizardry: Labyrinth of Lost Souls)
 Wizardry: Seimei no Kusabi, a Nintendo DS title
 Wizardry: Bōkyaku no Isan, a Nintendo DS title, which re-used elements from Seimei no Kusabi
 Wizardry Online Mobile, a mobile phone MMORPG, shut down in 2011.
 Wizardry: Torawareshi Bōrei no Machi, a PlayStation 3 RPG
 Tōkyō Meikyū – Wizardry 0 -, a Social-Networking Card-Battle RPG using the Mobage service on smartphones, shut down sometime in 2012
 Wizardry: Senran no Matō, a Social-Networking RPG for smartphones, shut down in 2015
 Wizardry Schema, an incremental game RPG for smartphones, shut down in 2017
 Wizrogue: Labyrinth of Wizardry, an isometric roguelike RPG with gacha game elements, originally shut down in 2015, it was re-launched in 2017 with the gacha elements removed.

These titles were released from late 2009 to 2016; the latest activity is the port of Wizardry: Labyrinth of Lost Souls to the PC in January 2020.

Related media
The popularity of Wizardry in Japan also inspired various light novels, manga comics, Japanese pen-and-paper role-playing games, and an original video animation, produced by TMS Entertainment. A popular light novel series titled Sword Art Online also had a character who stated that his inspiration came from this game. Most have been released only in Japan.

References

Bibliography

External links

 Wizardry Archives Info about the Wizardry Games

 
Video game franchises
Fantasy video games
Video game franchises introduced in 1981
First-person party-based dungeon crawler video games
Video games developed in Japan